Ram Rai  (Gurmukhi: ਰਾਮ ਰਾਏ; rāma rā'ē; 1645–1687) was the excommunicated eldest son of the seventh Sikh Guru, Guru Har Rai, and the founder of the Ramraiyas, an unorthodox and heretical sect in Sikhism.

Biography

Excommunication 
After Sikhs assisted the fleeing Dara Shikoh in the aftermath of the Battle of Samugarh, Aurangzeb demanded that the Sikh Guru explain his actions. Ram Rai was chosen by his father to represent him in the Mughal darbar (court) to explain why he had supported and given refuge to Dara Shikoh, during the Mughal war of succession of 1657–1661. During this meeting, the emperor complained that a verse from the Adi Granth was "anti-Islamic", in-response to this claim by the emperor, Ram Rai altered the words of the verse, which changed the context, instead of standing firm to his faith entirely. This had pleased the emperor. Ram Rai was excommunicated from the mainstream Sikh community by his father Guru Har Rai, after he learnt that his eldest son had altered gurbani to please Aurangzeb and nominated his younger son, Har Krishan, as next-in-line for the Sikh guruship before he died on 6 October 1661. This had foiled the plans of the Mughal emperor, who was keeping Ram Rai as a hostage, as he had been hoping that the Sikh guruship would pass onto Ram Rai so that he could enact control over the wider Sikh community by manipulating their titular head. After his excommunication, he founded the Guru Ram Rai Darbar Sahib, a Darbar in Dehradun which was built in Indo-Islamic architecture style. Ram Rai's brother, Guru Har Krishan, was the eighth of the ten Sikh Gurus.

Death 
After his death, he was succeeded as head of the sect by mahant Aud Dass, who was helped by Ram Rai's widow, Panjab Kaur.

References

Bibliography

External links

Guru Ram Rai Darbar Sahib - History

Sikh warriors
1645 births
1687 deaths
Punjabi people